Charro Days, also known as Charro Days Fiesta or Charro Days Festival, is a two-nation fiesta and an annual four-day pre-Lenten celebration held in Brownsville, Texas, United States in cooperation with Matamoros, Tamaulipas, Mexico. The grito—a joyous Mexican shout—opens the festivities every year. This festival is a shared heritage celebration between the two border cities of Brownsville, Texas and Matamoros, Tamaulipas. The Charro Days festivals usually have about 50,000 attendees each year. This celebration includes the Sombrero Festival as well as a parade that goes down Elizabeth St. through Historic Downtown Brownsville, TX.

History
The festival was first organized and celebrated 1937 by the Brownsville Chamber of Commerce to recognize Mexican culture and honor the charros, or the "dashing Mexican gentlemen cowboys." In addition, it is mentioned in the official webpage that the Charro Days festival was also created to bring people together during the effects of the Great Depression. Although not proven, it is rumored that the first “unofficial” Charro Days was realized in the early to mid-1800s, when people from the city of Brownsville, Texas, and Matamoros, Tamaulipas, just across the Rio Grande in Mexico, came together to celebrate a cooperative cultural festival to honor the two nations.

The festival went on hiatus in 1942–45 & 2021.

Traditions

The four-day festival has daily parades, food stands and music, people dancing in the street, boat races, fireworks, bull fights, and a rodeo in Brownsville and in its sister city of Matamoros.

Costumes
Costumes reflecting Mexico's tradition have been used by those who partake in the occasion.  Men, for the most part, wear traditional Mexican costumes—whether it is the charro costume or a cowboy one—while women wear the colorful Huipil costume.  The traditional costume is often worn by adults, elders, and children on all four days to celebrate and honor borderland heroes.

Events

Mr. Amigo Association, an organization that works for the friendly relationship with Matamoros, Tamaulipas, Mexico and Brownsville, Texas, United States and to preserve the Charro Days and Sombrero Festival celebrations, became a part of Charro Days in 1967. Sombrero Fest, a three-day Washington Park street party with food, popular rock, country and Tejano performers, was added in 1986. Moreover, it is worth mentioning that the first president of the Mr. Amigo Association was the former president of Mexico, Miguel Alemán Valdés.

During the creation of NAFTA agreement in 1988-1989, Congressman Solomon Ortiz presented the Mr. Amigo Association with the Mr. Amigo Review Award for the distinction of being one of the first organizations to extend friendship and mutual understanding between the United States and Mexico. The Mr. Amigo Review Award remains on exhibit at the Library of Congress in Washington, D.C. as a model of bi-national friendliness between these two countries.

See also
Charro
Sombrero
Sombrero Festival

References

External links
 Images of America: Charro Days in Brownsville
Mr. Amigo Association: Charro Days and Sombrero Festival

Latin American festivals
Festivals in Texas
History of Brownsville, Texas
Culture of Brownsville, Texas
Matamoros, Tamaulipas
Mexican culture
Hispanic and Latino American culture in Texas
Mexican-American culture in Texas
Tourist attractions in Tamaulipas